Zürich District is a district of the Swiss canton of Zürich in Switzerland.

History 
In 1814, the former district of Zürich was established including the municipalities – "Landgemeinden des Bezirks Zürich" (country municipalities) – surrounding the old city of Zürich, the so-called Altstadt. The district of Zürich as it exists today, was created on 1 July 1989, by splitting the former district of Zürich into three parts:

 The western part became the district of Dietikon;
 the eastern part became the district (respectively city) of Zürich with its subdivisions;
 the municipality of Zollikon located east of Zürich was integrated into the district of Meilen.

Municipalities (subdivisions) of the district of Zürich 

Since 1893 respectively 1934 the city of Zürich as well as the district of Zürich are formed by the old city of Zürich (Altstadt) and by a total of 19 former politically independent municipalities:

Mergers and exclusions 
 1871: Schwamendingen excluded → Oerlikon
 1893: Merger of Aussersihl, Enge, Fluntern, Hirslanden, Hottingen, Oberstrass, Riesbach, Unterstrass, Wiedikon, Wipkingen, Wollishofen and Altstadt → City of Zürich
 1931: Merger of Niederurdorf and Oberurdorf → Urdorf
 1934: Merger of Affoltern, Albisrieden, Altstetten, Höngg, Oerlikon, Schwamendingen, Seebach, Witikon and Zürich → City of Zürich
 1986: Zollikon excluded → Meilen District
 1989:  Exclusion of the then remaining 13, excluding the city of Zürich, municipalities → Dietikon District

See also 
 Municipalities of the canton of Zürich

References

External links 
  

Districts of the canton of Zürich